The Bachelorette was the first season of ABC reality television series The Bachelorette. The season premiered on January 8, 2003, and featured 29-year-old Trista Rehn, a pediatric physical therapist and former Miami Heat dancer from Indiana.

Rehn was the runner-up from the first season of The Bachelor featuring Alex Michel. The season concluded on February 19, 2003, with Rehn accepting a proposal from 28-year-old firefighter Ryan Sutter. They married on December 6, 2003 in Santa Monica, California, and currently live in Vail, Colorado with their two children.

Contestants
The following is the list of bachelors for this season:

Future appearances

The Bachelor
Bob Guiney was chosen to be the Bachelor in the fourth season of The Bachelor.

Dancing with the Stars
Rehn (now Sutter) competed in the very first season of Dancing with the Stars paired with professional dancer Louis Van Amstel. She was eliminated in week 1, finished in 6th place.

Other appearances
Ryan Sutter competed in the Reality Stars special of Fear Factor. Rehn made a special appearance.

Elimination Chart

 The contestant won the competition
 The contestant was on a group date
 The contestant was on a one-on-one date
 The contestant went on a group date and was eliminated at the rose ceremony
 The contestant quit the competition
 The contestant was eliminated at the rose ceremony

Episodes

References

2003 American television seasons
The Bachelorette (American TV series) seasons
Television shows filmed in California
Television shows filmed in New York (state)
Television shows filmed in Colorado
Television shows filmed in Missouri